"Dreams Go By" is a song written and performed by Harry Chapin. The song was included on his 1975 album, Portrait Gallery. The song is about life passing by, and your dreams not coming true. The song became a top 40 adult contemporary hit, peaking at #33 on the Billboard Adult Contemporary, where it stayed for two weeks.

Record World said that "the kind of delayed gratification that parents have been urging upon children since time began takes on a distinctively different hue here in this family-based classic" and that "broken dreams are pieced back together with much Chapin insight."

Chart performance

Weekly charts

References

1974 songs
Elektra Records singles
Harry Chapin songs
Songs written by Harry Chapin
Song recordings produced by Paul Leka